Chris Anthony may refer to:
Chris Anthony (American football), Arena Football League wide receiver/linebacker
Chris Anthony (artist), Swedish artist
Chris Anthony (rugby union) (born 1976), former international Wales rugby union player
Chris Anthony (voice actress), American voice actress